Soviet Submarine S-350 was a Romeo class submarine.

Fate
On January 11, 1962, the Soviet Foxtrot class submarine B-37 exploded as the result of a fire which detonated all torpedo warheads in the submarine. The S-350, which was moored next to B-37, was heavily damaged. Eleven crew members of the S-350 were killed.

Romeo-class submarines of the Soviet Navy
Ships built in the Soviet Union
1962 ships
Cold War submarines of the Soviet Union
Maritime incidents in 1962